Rao is a fictional star in the DC Comics Universe. It is the red giant (in some continuities, red dwarf) that the planet Krypton orbited. The title also refers to a supervillain of the same name and same Kryptonian etymology. He is also the ancestor of Superman in all continuities.

"Rao" is also later written into the Superman mythology as the name of a Kryptonian deity, the personification of their sun, worshipped as a god of light and life. As such the name was sometimes invoked in the comics as a Kryptonian exclamation. For instance, 'By Rao, that curry is hot' or 'Thank Rao you're ok'.

History
In the early years of Superman comics, the sun of Krypton was unnamed and was given no effect on Superman's powers, which were attributed first to greater evolution, and then to a combination of innate powers and Earth's lower gravity. Starting in 1960, the fact that Earth's sun was yellow while Krypton's was red became the explanation for Superman's powers, with our sunlight fueling them like the charge of a battery. In the standard Silver Age continuity existing up until Crisis on Infinite Earths, Rao's red sun radiation actively suppressed the superhuman abilities of Kryptonians, as their powers only worked in the radiation of a yellow sun. The post-Crisis version created by John Byrne stated that Kryptonians absorbed solar energy, with the dim output of Rao being just enough to sustain them, and a yellow sun producing enough energy to "supercharge" a Kryptonian metabolism to levels of power not seen in their native environment, though it takes years for Clark Kent to build up enough energy to reach the level of power he displays as Superman. The 2004 graphic novel Superman: Birthright corroborates this, although in recent years, other writers have depicted red-sun radiation matching that of Rao as once again actively shutting down Kryptonian powers, for as long as an individual is exposed to it.

References to Rao began to creep into Superman's speech in the 1970s under the editorship and policy of Julius Schwartz, with Superman occasionally exclaiming "Great Rao!" instead of his standard "Great Krypton!".

In Super Friends #47 (August 1981), Superman reveals that "Rao" is also the Kryptonian name for God. This was subsequently confirmed in "mainstream" DC continuity of the time in the 1982 miniseries Phantom Zone.

Sandman: Endless Nights
In the Sandman graphic novel Endless Nights, there is a story with Rao as the personification of the Kryptonian sun. The story hints that the Kryptonian race and Kal-El's survival was no coincidence, but a making of Rao.

In that story, Despair of the Endless speaks with Rao some billion years ago:

Think about it, Rao. Wouldn't bringing life onto a planet that is inherently unstable add to the beauty of the life? If at any moment, it could explode...Truly it would only be perfectly beautiful, a perfect piece of art, if one single life-form escaped. To remember, to mourn, to despair.

The Last God of Krypton
In Superman: The Last God of Krypton, a trade paperback by Walter Simonson, Greg Hildebrandt and Tim Hildebrandt, when Krypton was a primitive planet, Rao held a war against Cythonna, Goddess Of Ice. This was later referred to as "The Wars of Fire and Ice". Cythonna lost, and was imprisoned by Rao in another dimension. She managed to escape, and started to look for Kal-El, the last Kryptonian and a direct descendant of Rao himself. She sought to kill Kal-El and have her ultimate revenge on Rao, who had abandoned Krypton millennia before it exploded.

Superman and Cythonna held a final battle in the sun, resulting in Superman's victory due to the power boost he received from fighting so close to his own power source, imprisoning Cythonna in the sun's core, due to its gravity.

Krypton Chronicles
It is described in detail in E. Nelson Bridwell's Krypton Chronicles that later on in Kryptonian history, Rao went from being the sun to a much more cosmic, monotheistic concept, which is "he who ignited the sun".

Infinite Crisis
In Infinite Crisis #7, Superman and Kal-L carry Superboy-Prime through Rao to remove his powers, which enables his defeat. In the same issue, Krypton's sun is called Eldirao (El being the Kryptonian word for "Star"). DC comics writer Kurt Busiek, who coined the name, described this concept: "See, I always interpreted "EL" to be "Star". Kal-El means "Starchild" but it might be more directly 'Child of the Star' by my reckoning. And that would make Eldirao "Star of Rao" or something similar".

Superman: New Krypton
It is revealed in the DC comics event New Krypton that, according to the Kryptonian mythology, Rao is the first being to be born out of the void before the universe. Feeling lonely, he sought to bring order to the chaos from which he was born, and thus created the universe. After countless eons of ordering the cosmos, Rao created Krypton, a planet meant to be a jewel in his creation. Rao then created all the other Kryptonian gods from his own essence, and these "godlings" called him "Father Rao". Rao, in the time just before and after the destruction of Krypton, is thought of by the people of Krypton like the God in Abrahamic Religions is on Earth. He is all-knowing, all-powerful and eternal. He is served by his minor gods, who could be better understood as his angels. Each minor god is worshiped by a guild or caste on Krypton while all people worshiped Rao.

The people of Krypton call their powers under a yellow sun the power of Rao. The high priest of Krypton is said to be the Voice of Rao and only speaks to voice Rao's judgement. Rao works through avatars. The Nightwing and the Flamebird are two mythological dragon/phoenix creatures who serve Rao; the Nightwing of shadow and the Flamebird of Fire. Each generation, Nightwing and Flamebird are reborn in two individuals who are blessed with a great love for each other that is doomed to end tragically in death. According to the comics, just before the destruction of Krypton, the Nightwing and Flamebird of that generation tried to avoid each other, believing themselves to be crazy to feel the influence of the myths.

In the New Krypton story line, the Phantom Zone prisoner Jax-Ur becomes possessed by a minor Kryptonian god obsessed with ending the world and making a new one. Jax-Ur takes part of Nightwing and Flamebird to make a fake body of the god Rao that he uses to absorb more energy to end the world and make a new one. As the military around the world only help to make the fake god more powerful, Nightwing, Flamebird, and the JSA try to stop Rao but do little until Wonder Woman, armed with an axe blessed by her Greek gods, is able to hurt Rao. In the end, Nightwing opens a portal to the Phantom Zone, sending Jax-Ur and his fake Rao in to the Phantom Zone.

The fake body remains are used by Lex Luthor with a time machine and a ballistic missile to turn Earth's sun red during the War of the Supermen storyline to destroy most of the Kryptonians.

The New 52
In September 2011, The New 52 rebooted DC's continuity. In this new timeline, Action Comics #14 identifies Rao as being LHS 2520, a real-life red dwarf star 27.1 light years away from Earth, located at right ascension 12 hours, 10 minutes, 5.6 seconds, and declination -15 degrees, 4 minutes, 15.66 seconds. This idea was posited by astrophysicist Neil deGrasse Tyson, who makes a guest appearance in the issue.

Rao (the Kryptonian deity) was revealed to be an actual Kryptonian individual who served as the main antagonist in the 2016 Justice League of America comic series (part of the Prime Earth continuity) created by writer-artist Bryan Hitch. He was revealed in this series to be a parasitic false god who sustained his immortality through absorbing parts of the lifespans of his followers, and in this series attempted to use Superman's cells to transform the physiology of humans on Earth so that they would become pure-blooded Kryptonians, in so doing giving Rao even more godlike power in addition to his immortality. Rao is later killed by Superman above the Earth.

In other media

Films
In the 1978 Superman: The Movie, Rao appears as an old red giant star. This follows the origins of Superman closely to the comics in which Rao is not the sole cause of Krypton's destruction, but rather, its own core. The final destruction, however, is ultimately caused by the explosion of Rao, which in turn completely obliterates Krypton.

In the 2006 film Superman Returns, Rao, a red giant star instead of a red giant becomes a type II supernova, destroying Krypton completely.

In the 2013 film Man of Steel, Rao is depicted as a 13-billion-year-old red dwarf.

TV

Smallville
Rao is mentioned several times within of season 9 of the series Smallville. Beginning in "Crossfire", R.A.O. Corporation or R.A.O. is a solar-energy company run by Major Zod as a front in order to harness the powers of the yellow sun for powerless-citizens of Kandor. He planned for it to be bought by LuthorCorp so that they would be able to finance a project that Zod had planned: a self sustaining solar tower needing no outside energy sources. The Kandorian soldiers masqueraded as construction workers and scientists to have this tower constructed with the help of LuthorCorp and Metropolis's construction crew. Faora and Alia were amongst them. After Clark Kent recovered from the effects of gemstone kryptonite, he used concentrated power of his heat vision to bring the tower crumbling down. However, among the wreckage, a Kryptonian-like crystal console was found intact. Tess Mercer managed to find it in the ruins and took it to the crow's nest that Clark goes to look over the city in Metropolis.

The "Book of Rao" is first mentioned in the next episode "Kandor". While held captive by Tess Mercer, Jor-El states: "Our sacred book of Rao teaches that wherever there is light, there is darkness". Earlier, Jor-El is seen by Chloe Sullivan, through cameras secretly installed in the Kent farm, hiding a Kryptonian artifact. In subsequent episodes, this artifact is revealed to be the Book of Rao.

In "Upgrade", Zod (of Kandor) tells Clark of "the red sun god Rao", in the Fortress of Solitude. He explains that on Krypton "religion is science" and that Jor-El left their bible, the Book of Rao, on Earth. Zod proclaims that he is after the knowledge in that book, having already gained the Kryptonian powers under the yellow sun from Clark's own blood.

In the final episode of that season, "Salvation", it is revealed that the Book of Rao is in fact a key that will transport all Kryptonians on Earth to a "higher plane of existence", implied to be a form of Heaven, but not explained fully. Clark uses the key and transports all of Zod's soldiers away from Earth, but Zod avoids this with the use of a Blue Kryptonite dagger. In a final battle, Clark takes the dagger away after being stabbed in the chest, Zod reverts to his Kryptonian self and is taken with the rest of his soldiers to New Krypton. Zod is then banished by the Kandorians to the Phantom Zone where he reunites with his original self as a Phantom.

Supergirl
In Supergirl, Kryptonian characters such as Kara and Non sometimes say "Praise Rao" or "Thank Rao" when reacting to extreme situations. In episode four of the third season, "The Faithful", Supergirl encounters Thomas Coville, a man who was on the plane she saved in the series pilot and subsequently founded a cult that worships both Rao and Supergirl.

Krypton
In Krypton, Rao is depicted as a red dwarf star with Krypton becoming tidally locked to it in the distant past causing Kryptonians to retreat into nine protective domed cities like Kryptonopolis and Kandor. A powerful theocracy leads the government with the regal leader calling himself the Voice of Rao (played by Blake Ritson), but he is revealed to be controlled by Brainiac.

Video games

Injustice: Gods Among Us
In the story mode of Injustice: Gods Among Us, High Councilor Superman (who has become a dictator in this alternate timeline) sends out a televised message to the world, announcing the capture of Batman (in actuality the normal timeline's Batman and not the alternate reality's insurgent leader), and his execution, ending with "may Rao have mercy on his soul". At the end of the story, the alternate Superman is placed in a chamber that radiates red sun illumination, nullifying his powers.

Injustice 2
In Injustice 2, Supergirl occasionally mentions the Kryptonian deity when facing certain characters such as Darkseid or Enchantress by saying "My God Rao will protect me", with Darkseid responding "There is no Rao. Only Darkseid", while the Enchantress responds by saying "Like he protected your mother?". Additionally Krypton's sun is seen in the background of Krypton in the story mode's opening though it does not appear red from the planet's surface. The red sun prison where Superman is imprisoned appears as a stage. During the main story the red sun prison is attacked by Supergirl and the Regime. Firestorm and Blue Beetle hold them off long enough for Batman to arrive, though he decides to free Superman due to the threat posed by Brainiac who is later revealed to have come to Earth so he can capture Superman before learning of Kara Zor-El's survival and focuses on capturing her instead, forcing Batman and Superman to work together to stop Brainiac. Having already studied the effects of red sun radiation on Kryptonian cells, Brainiac wishes to study the effects of yellow sun radiation on Kryptonian cells by dissecting Supergirl, though he is defeated just as one of his Betas is about to start the procedure. In the Superman story mode ending, Supergirl is imprisoned in Superman's former cell in the red sun prison due to siding with Batman against the Regime. Having fused with Brainiac's ship, Superman attempts to persuade her to side with him by showing her Batman, in which Kara is horrified to learn that Superman has placed under his control using Brainiac's technology, but Kara's ultimate fate is not shown. In Batman's story mode ending, Batman and Supergirl choose to imprison Superman in the Phantom Zone instead of returning him back to the red sun prison.

References

Comics characters introduced in 1999
DC Comics deities
Mythology in DC Comics
Kryptonians
Fictional astronomical objects
Fictional characters with immortality
Characters created by Walt Simonson
DC Comics supervillains
Characters created by Bryan Hitch
Comics characters introduced in 2015
Superman characters